Coles Bay may refer to:

 Coles Bay, Tasmania, Australia
 Coles Bay, British Columbia is located in North Saanich on the Saanich Peninsula
 Colesbukta, a bay at Spitsbergen, Svalbard, Norway

See also
 Cole Bay, Saskatchewan, Canada